Queers Against Israeli Apartheid (QuAIA) was a Toronto-based grassroots LGBT group involved in the movement against what the organization see as Israeli apartheid and is a member of the Coalition Against Israeli Apartheid.  The group has been involved in Israeli Apartheid Week as well as Toronto Pride Week.  QuAIA formed shortly after the 2008 iteration of Israeli Apartheid Week at which queer activists had a discussion about "pinkwashing", or the use of gay rights as a propaganda tool to justify Israel's policy toward Palestine.  The group went on to form contingents for the 2008-2010 and 2012 Pride parades, as well as holding forums, discussion panels and cultural events in Toronto.

The group announced in February 2015 that it was disbanding after seven years of activity.

Pride 2010: Banning from parade and fallout 

In 2010, the group was initially banned from marching in the Pride Toronto Parade, despite receiving statements of support from queer organizations within and outside Canada, including the three major Palestinian queer rights organizations.
However, following a backlash from the local queer community,
Pride Toronto reversed their decision to ban the words "Israeli Apartheid" as of June 23, 2010.

Yakov M. Rabkin, professor of history at the Université de Montréal, spoke out in favor of QuAIA's message and their right to march in the parade in the pages of the National Post, saying,

Gil Troy, professor of History at McGill University, has criticized Queers against Israeli Apartheid:

QuAIA marched in the parade on July 4, 2010, along with their allies in the Pride Coalition for Free Speech, largely without incident.  

  Several members of the organization have written from their own perspective how the ban on the phrase "Israeli Apartheid" came to pass in 2010 and was later overturned, as well as an argument written by group spokesperson Tim McCaskell relating QuAIA's politics with his previous solidarity work on behalf of Simon Nkoli, a gay anti-apartheid activist in former apartheid-era South Africa.

Pride 2011: City Manager's report and decision to pull out of parade

City Manager's report 

On April 13, 2011 the non-partisan Toronto City Manager, Joe Pennachetti, released a report for the City Council Executive Committee concluding that "the participation of QUAIA in the Pride Parade based solely on the phrase 'Israeli Apartheid' does not violate the City’s Anti-Discrimination Policy. The City also cannot therefore conclude that the use of term on signs or banners to identify QuAIA constitutes the promotion of hatred or seeks to incite discrimination contrary to the Code."

Speaking to the Toronto Star, QuAIA spokesperson Tim McCaskell stated that the city manager and staff had “obviously done their homework, and talked to lawyers, and not made this a political decision but one that’s based on a reasonable look at the facts of the matter and of Canadian law... It basically vindicates everything we’ve been saying for the last two years.”  Toronto mayor Rob Ford indicated that he plans to defund the parade regardless of the City Manager report.

Pride funding battle 

Two days later on April 15, 2011, citing the City Manager's report QuAIA announced that it will not march in the 2011 Toronto Pride Parade for the stated purpose of "pos[ing] a challenge for Mayor Rob Ford."  QuAIA spokesperson Elle Flanders elaborated by stating "Rob Ford wants to use us as an excuse to cut Pride funding, even though he has always opposed funding the parade, long before we showed up.  By holding our Pride events outside of the parade, we are forcing him to make a choice: fund Pride or have your real homophobic, right-wing agenda exposed."  QuAIA's press release further stated that the organization would instead host a community event in support of the Boycott, Divestment and Sanctions campaign.

The announcement was generally considered a surprise, even by media that had been following the story closely.  According to the Toronto Star, "QuAIA’s decision [not to march] represents a significant tactical shift for the group, which fought intensely last year for the right to participate in Pride."

At a May 24, 2011 meeting of the executive committee, City Hall voted unanimously to accept the city manager's report, which made it likely that Pride Toronto would receive funding  Deputations were given on the issue by over 50 speakers, which included QuAIA itself that had made a short video specifically for the purpose. The video can be seen here.

Alternative plans to parade 

In mid June it was revealed that the community event QuAIA planned to host would feature prominent writer and anti-AIDS activist Sarah Schulman speaking in favor of the boycott, divestment and sanctions (BDS) campaign from an LGBT perspective.  

The event was held June 22, 2011 at Toronto's historic Gladstone Hotel.

The following evening, June 23, a second event was held that featured Sarah Schulman speaking on her history of fighting homophobia and AIDS activism in the ACT UP! organization in New York City.  The second event was cosponsored with numerous queer and AIDS activist organizations.

During her visit, Schulman was also interviewed by local queer media Xtra!, primarily focusing on how she came to support the BDS campaign as a queer activist.

In lieu of participation in the actual Parade, QuAIA dropped a 40-foot banner from above Toronto's Wellesley subway station promoting a campaign to boycott LGBT leisure tourism to Israel.  The banner drop occurred on July 3, the day of the 2011 Pride Parade, in the heart of Toronto's historic LGBT district.  The banner read "Support Palestinian Queers, Boycott Israeli Tourism."

Pride 2012: Return to Pride parade 

In June 2012, the Toronto city council voted to condemn the phrase "Israeli apartheid," as part of a resolution recognizing the gay Pride Toronto parade as a “significant cultural event that strongly promotes the ideals of tolerance and diversity.” The resolution said it slams the term Israel Apartheid for undermining the values of Pride and diminishing “the suffering experienced by individuals during the apartheid regime in South Africa.”

Pride Toronto's Dispute Resolution Committee, composed of lawyers with experience in arbitration and mediation in human rights matters, rejected a complaint against QuAIA by B'nai Brith Canada that sought to ban the group from the parade. The panel dismissed the complaint, stating that “the activities of QUAIA are not contrary to the core missions or policies of Pride Toronto,” and that it is “not likely to present images or messages that promote, condone or may promote or condone violence, hatred, degradation or negative stereotypes of a person or group, contrary to the City of Toronto’s Anti-Discrimination Policy.”

Pride 2013: City staff reports and further Pride funding debates

City staff reports 

In response to a September 10, 2012 request from Toronto city council's executive committee, city staff released a series of three reports on April 9, 2013, regarding the city's anti-discrimination policy and grants policy 
.  These staff reports built on and largely reiterated the 2011 report from the city manager.  Regarding the city's grants policy, one of these reports stated:

QuAIA's Tim McCaskell was quoted in response saying, "The law is clear to everyone except a handful of right-wing councillors: you can’t ban the phrase ‘Israeli apartheid.'"  Meanwhile, Councillor James Pasternak was quoted, "Stopping QuAIA is like trying to hammer jelly against the wall."  

It was also pointed out in the media that no such funding restrictions had been attempted against the Art Gallery of Ontario or Toronto International Film Festival, which had also held events at which the phrase "Israeli Apartheid" was supposedly employed.  Finally, the third report in the series from city staff was not publicly released, but dealt with "litigation or potential litigation affecting the City of Toronto," according to its author Chris Brillinger, executive director of social development, finance and administration for the city.

Executive committee deputations and motion to defer 

At an April 23, 2013 meeting, the city's executive committee heard deputations from 27 individuals, most of whom reportedly spoke in favor of recommendations from city staff.  This included one Holocaust Survivor, Suzanne Weiss, who stated, "A sweeping ban on disrespectful speech will threaten every citizen’s rights."  Meanwhile, national director of legal affairs for B’nai Brith Canada, Anita Bromberg, argued instead that the parade is not a political demonstration, saying, "This is a city-wide celebration. I am deeply offended."

QuAIA member Elle Flanders spoke on her experience living in Ramallah for a year, saying, "My partner and I traveled every day for six months on a segregated road system; they are known as the apartheid roads because they are segregated by your ethnic identity. Roads for Jewish Israelis, roads for Palestinians."   

CEO and director of Toronto International Film Festival (TIFF) also commented on the issue; discussing the usage of the phrase 'Israeli Apartheid' at TIFF, he said

However, following a motion from Councillor David Shiner, the committee voted to defer recommendations from city staff until a May 28 meeting, after which the item could proceed to full council in June.  In response, Councillor Kristyn Wong-Tam was quoted as saying, "Perhaps what [Councillor James Pasternak and Shiner] are trying to do is mobilize and organize the opposing side... We have Councillor Pasternak, who is actively trying to defund Pride, who is actively lobbying councillors to swing his way. So this could be the political strategy he needs to defund Pride."  

In the aftermath of the deferred motion, Councilor Pasternak suggested that instead of facing the possibility of being defunded, Pride should be offered the possibility of additional funding if it chooses to ban QuAIA from participation in the Pride festival.  Acknowledging there was reluctance on the part of city council to defund Pride, Pasternak stated, "What you do is allow Pride to keep their existing grant and provide a diversity bonus after the parade should QuAIA not participate. So we are changing the conversation to a diversity bonus."  Pride co-chair Francisco Alvarez responded by calling the offer, "desperate and insincere."

Campaigns and activism

LGBT tourism boycott

In September 2009, a statement was released on the QuAIA website calling for a boycott of LGBT leisure tourism to Israel. 
  This campaign was prominently promoted in a banner drop at the 2011 Pride Parade.

Freedom Flotilla

Filmmaker and QuAIA member John Greyson has been listed as one of the participants in the 2011 Freedom Flotilla II.  Greyson is reported to be a passenger aboard the Canadian boat "Tahrir."    Greyson's participation in the Flotilla came to the public spotlight in the aftermath of a hoax video in which an Israeli actor claimed that gays weren't welcome to participate in the flotilla.

Cultural events

At the 2011 Inside Out LGBT film festival QuAIA jointly sponsored a program consisting of film shorts produced by artists in Lebanon, Palestine and their diasporas.  The program was titled "With Love from Le(z)Banon and Pa(lez)tine" and was followed by a talk by Professor Samar Habib on queer representation in Egyptian cinema.  QuAIA co-sponsored the program with Queer Ontario.  
  Local Toronto alternative media company Deviant Productions conducted an interview with Professor Habib after the event, in which she further discussed queer representation in Arab cinema.

In 2013, QuAIA partnered with the Toronto Palestine Film Festival to present lesbian filmmaker Barbara Hammer's Witness: Palestine, which Hammer had created in response to her experiences on the first LGBTQ Solidarity Tour of Palestine in 2012.  The film was presented at Toronto's Images Festival.

References

External links
Queers Against Israeli Apartheid

Israel and apartheid
Non-governmental organizations involved in the Israeli–Palestinian conflict
LGBT political advocacy groups in Canada
Queer organizations
2008 establishments in Ontario
2015 disestablishments in Ontario
Organizations based in Toronto